Statistics of Kuwaiti Premier League for the 1991–92 season.

Overview
It was contested by 14 teams, and Al Qadisiya Kuwait won the championship.

Group stage

Group A

Group B

Championship Playoffs

Semifinals
Al Salmiya Club 0-1 Al Yarmouk
Al Qadisiya Kuwait 1-0 Al Arabi Kuwait

Third place match
Al Salmiya Club 2-1 Al Arabi Kuwait

Final
Al Qadisiya Kuwait 2-0 Al Yarmouk

References
Kuwait - List of final tables (RSSSF)

1992
Kuw
1